Luis James Longstaff (born 24 February 2001) is an English footballer who plays as a midfielder for Scottish Championship side Cove Rangers.

Career
Longstaff made his professional debut for Liverpool on 17 December 2019, starting in the away match against Aston Villa in the quarter-finals of the EFL Cup.

On 31 August 2021, he joined Scottish third tier side Queen's Park on loan until 30 June 2022.

In June 2022 it was announced by Liverpool that he would leave the club at the end of the month when his contract expired.

On 4 August 2022, he joined Scottish Championship side Cove Rangers.

Personal life
Although of a similar age and originating from the same part of north-east England as fellow players Sean and Matty Longstaff, he is not related to them.

Career statistics

Club

Honours
Liverpool
 FA Youth Cup: 2018–19

References

External links

 
 
 
 

2001 births
Living people
Footballers from Darlington
English footballers
Association football midfielders
Liverpool F.C. players
England youth international footballers
Queen's Park F.C. players
Newcastle United F.C. players
Cove Rangers F.C. players